Lethe nicetas , the  yellow woodbrown, is a species of Satyrinae butterfly found in the  Indomalayan realm (Sikkim, Assam, Manipur)

References

nicetas
Butterflies of Asia